Nyanza Lac is a city in southern Burundi, in Makamba Province. The city is located on the shores of Lake Tanganyika, to the south of Mutambara and close to the border with Tanzania.

References
Fitzpatrick, M., Parkinson, T., & Ray, N. (2006) East Africa. Footscray, VIC: Lonely Planet.

Populated places in Burundi